Faro, Goddess of the Waters is a 2007 film.

Synopsis 
Zanga, a child born out of wedlock, is driven out of his village. After many years, he returns to find out who is father is. At the moment of his arrival, something happens that the villagers interpret as the river spirit Faro's angry reaction to the bastard’s coming.

Awards 
 Namur 2007

External links 

 

2007 films
Malian drama films
Burkinabé drama films